Ahmad Jamshidian (born 16 May 1984, in Hamedan) is an Iranian football striker who most recently played for Esteghlal in the Iran Pro League.

Club career
He started to shine Rah Ahan and moved to Sepahan in summer 2008 and had a very good season in his first season. In June 2013, Jamshidian signed for Esteghlal and played his first match as a substitute for Pejman Nouri in 2–1 win over Gostaresh.

Club career statistics

 Assist Goals

International career
He started his career in December 2008 against Ecuador.

Honours

Club
Sepahan
Iran Pro League (3): 2009–10, 2010–11, 2011–12
Hazfi Cup (1): 2012–13

References

External links
Jamshidian joins Esteghlal
Ahmad Jamshidian at PersianLeague.com

Iranian footballers
Association football forwards
Malavan players
Rah Ahan players
Sepahan S.C. footballers
1984 births
Living people
Esteghlal F.C. players
Persian Gulf Pro League players